Vermillion Township is one of eighteen townships in Appanoose County, Iowa, United States. As of the 2010 census, its population was 808. I

Geography
According to the USGS, it contains three cemeteries: Dale, Jewish and Thomas. From time to time, the city of Centerville has annexed portions of the township.

References

External links
 US-Counties.com
 City-Data.com

Townships in Appanoose County, Iowa
Townships in Iowa